James of Douai was a French philosopher who taught at the University of Paris.

James was a Master of Arts who wrote commentaries on Aristotle. He defended the freedom of philosophers to engage in speculation. In 1275, the papal legate Simon of Brion appointed him proctor of the Picard nation at the university. He was probably one of the targets of the Condemnation of 1277. It is possible that the philosopher is the same person as the James of Douai who was a monk at the Abbey of Saint Bertin from 1287 to 1311.

Two commentaries on Aristotle's Meteorology and Nicomachean Ethics were once attributed to James, but his authorship now doubted. The commentary on Meteorology does contain ideas similar to those in James's known commentary on On the Soul. He adhered to the Averroist doctrine that knowledge was the ultimate perfecter of humans. James wrote commentaries of the summa and quaestiones form on Aristotle's On Length and Shortness of Life, On Memory, On Sleep, Sense and Sensibilia, Physics, Prior Analytics and Posterior Analytics.

References

Further reading
Ebbesen, Sten (2015). "James of Douai on Dreams". Cahiers de l'institut du Moyen Âge grec et latin 84:22–92.
Grabmann, Martin (1956). "Jakob von Douai: ein Aristoteleskommentator zur Zeit des heiligen Thomas von Aquin und des Siger von Brabant". Mittelalterliches Geistesleben 3:158–179.
Guldentops, Guy (2006). "James of Douai's Theory of Knowledge", pp. 1143–1154 in M.C. Pacheco and J. Meirinhos (eds.), Intellect and Imagination in Medieval Philosophy. Brepols. 
Guldentops, Guy (2007). "A Short Introduction to James of Douai's Philosophy of Mind", pp. 21–43 in Paul J. J. M. Bakker and J. M. M. H. Thijssen (eds.), Mind, Cognition and Representation: The Tradition of Commentaries on Aristotle's De Anima. Ashgate.

People from Douai
13th-century French philosophers
Academic staff of the University of Paris
Latin commentators on Aristotle